Dillon is an unincorporated community in Raleigh County, West Virginia, United States. It was also known as Irish Mountain and is the location of St. Colman's Roman Catholic Church and Cemetery, which is on the National Register of Historic Places.

The community was named after the local Dillon family.

References 

Unincorporated communities in West Virginia
Unincorporated communities in Raleigh County, West Virginia